The Broadway Concert is a live recording of a Broadway-themed concert given by Lea Salonga in Manila. She sings 15 songs from the musicals including a rendition of "Too Much For One Heart", a song from the original production of Miss Saigon.

Track listing
 "Overture"
 "Maybe" (by Katrice Gavino)
 "I Can See It" (duet with Katrice Gavino)
 "I've Never Been in Love Before"
 "I Enjoy Being a Girl"
 "Love, Look Away"
 "Andrew Lloyd Webber Medley:"
 "I Don't Know How to Love Him"
 "As If We Never Said Goodbye"
 "Don't Cry for Me Argentina"
 "Someone Else's Story"
 "Nothing"
 "You'll Never Get Away from Me/Wherever We Go" (duet with Katrice Gavino)
 "Too Much for One Heart"
 "Where Is Love/As Long as He Needs Me"
 "Someone to Watch Over Me"
 "Someone Like You"
 "Something Wonderful/Being Alive"

Bertelsmann Music Group albums
Lea Salonga albums
2002 albums